Farah-Chakansur Province is a defunct province of Afghanistan. In 1863, Sher Ali Khan formed the province of Farah and separated it from Herat and Kandahar. Formerly Farah had been subject to Herat, but instead he made it a separate province and gave it to his cousin, Sardar Mohammad Afzal (not to be confused with Mohammad Afzal Khan.) In 1964 it was divided into Farah Province and Nimruz Province. The former province's capital was Farah.

The province was divided into seven districts:

 Farah
 Lash Wa Juwain
 Chakhansur
 Posht-i Rud
 Bakwa
 Gulistan
 Shahiwan

References

Sources
Statoids.com - Provinces of Afghanistan

History of Farah Province
History of Nimruz Province
Former provinces of Afghanistan